Grana may refer to:

Places

Croatia
 Grana, Varaždin County, a village in Varaždin County, Croatia

Germany
 Grana, Germany, a municipality in Saxony-Anhalt, Germany

Italy
 Grana, Piedmont, a commune in the Province of Asti
 Grana del Monferrato a river which rises in the Province of Asti

Spain
 Grana, Galicia, a municipality also known as San Bernabé

People 
 Ariel Damian Grana (born 1976), Argentinian footballer, also known as Ariel Grana
 César Graña (1919–1986), American sociologist and anthropologist of Peruvian origin
 Hernán Grana (born 1985), Argentine football defender 
 Lorena Johana Graña Fernández (born 1997), Uruguayan footballer 
 Octavio De La Grana (born 1961), Cuban-American basketball coach
 Pablo Graña (born 1999), Spanish sprint canoeist
 Rosa Graña Garland (1909–2003), Peruvian fashion designer and costumer also known as Mocha Graña 
 Saverio (Sam) Grana, Canadian television and film producer and screenwriter

Other uses
 The plural of grano, one 120th of a piastra
 Grana (fashion company), based in Hong Kong
 Grana (singular: granum), thylakoid stacks in chloroplasts
 Grana (cheese), a class of hard cheeses such as Parmigiano-Reggiano and Grana Padano
 Grana (journal), a scientific journal for palynology and aerobiology, published in Stockholm